Elizabeth Blanchard (1834–1891) was an American educator who was the seventh president of Mount Holyoke College (as Principal and Acting President).

Blanchard graduated from Mount Holyoke Female Seminary in 1858, and taught there for twelve years before becoming the Associate Principal from 1872-1883.  She served as Principal from 1883-1888.  When Mount Holyoke Female Seminary received its collegiate charter and became Mount Holyoke College, she served as Acting President from 1888-1889.

See also
Presidents of Mount Holyoke College

References

External links
Biography

Mount Holyoke College faculty
Presidents and Principals of Mount Holyoke College
1834 births
1891 deaths